Events in the year 1864 in Portugal.

Incumbents
Monarch: Louis I
Prime Minister: Nuno José Severo de Mendoça Rolim de Moura Barreto, 1st Duke of Loulé

Events
11 September - Legislative election.
29 September – Signing of the Treaty of Lisbon, on boundaries between Spain and Portugal
Banco Nacional Ultramarino established

Arts and entertainment

Births

6 June – Alfredo de Sá Cardoso, military officer and politician (died 1950)
11 August – Duarte Leite, historian, mathematician, journalist, diplomat and politician (died 1950)

Deaths

References

 
1860s in Portugal
Years of the 19th century in Portugal
Portugal